In mathematics, the classification of finite simple groups states that every finite simple group is cyclic, or alternating, or in one of 16 families of groups of Lie type, or one of 26 sporadic groups.

The list below gives all finite simple groups, together with their order, the size of the Schur multiplier, the size of the outer automorphism group, usually some small representations, and lists of all duplicates.

Summary 

The following table is a complete list of the 18 families of finite simple groups and the 26 sporadic simple groups, along with their orders. Any non-simple members of each family are listed, as well as any members duplicated within a family or between families. (In removing duplicates it is useful to note that no two finite simple groups have the same order, except that the group A8 = A3(2) and A2(4) both have order 20160, and that the group Bn(q) has the same order as  Cn(q) for q odd, n > 2. The smallest of the latter pairs of groups are B3(3) and C3(3) which both have order 4585351680.)

There is an unfortunate conflict between the notations for the alternating groups An and the groups of Lie type An(q).  Some authors use various different fonts for An to distinguish them.  In particular,
in this article we make the distinction by setting the alternating groups An in Roman font and the Lie-type groups An(q) in italic.

In what follows, n is a positive integer, and q is a positive power of a prime number p, with the restrictions noted. The notation (a,b) represents the greatest common divisor of the integers a and b.

Cyclic groups, Zp
Simplicity: Simple for p a prime number.

Order: p

Schur multiplier: Trivial.

Outer automorphism group: Cyclic of order p − 1.

Other names: Z/pZ, Cp

Remarks: These are the only simple groups that are not perfect.

Alternating groups, An, n > 4

Simplicity: Solvable for n < 5, otherwise simple.

Order: n!/2  when n > 1.

Schur multiplier: 2 for n = 5 or n > 7, 6 for n = 6 or 7; see Covering groups of the alternating and symmetric groups

Outer automorphism group: In general 2.  Exceptions: for n = 1, n = 2, it is trivial, and for n = 6, it has order 4 (elementary abelian).

Other names: Altn.

Isomorphisms: A1 and A2 are trivial. A3 is cyclic of order 3. A4 is isomorphic to A1(3) (solvable).  A5 is isomorphic to A1(4) and to A1(5). A6 is isomorphic to A1(9) and to the derived group B2(2)′. A8 is isomorphic to A3(2).

Remarks: An index 2 subgroup of the symmetric group of permutations of n points when n > 1.

Groups of Lie type 

Notation: n is a positive integer,  q > 1 is a power of a prime number p, and is the order of some underlying finite field. The order of the outer automorphism group is written as  d⋅f⋅g, where d is the order of the group of "diagonal automorphisms", f is the order of the (cyclic) group of "field automorphisms" (generated by a Frobenius automorphism), and g is the order of the group of "graph automorphisms" (coming from automorphisms of the Dynkin diagram). The notation (a,b) represents the greatest common divisor of the integers a and b.

Chevalley groups, An(q), Bn(q) n > 1, Cn(q) n > 2, Dn(q) n > 3

Chevalley groups, E6(q), E7(q), E8(q), F4(q), G2(q)

Steinberg groups, 2An(q2) n > 1, 2Dn(q2) n > 3, 2E6(q2), 3D4(q3)

Suzuki groups, 2B2(22n+1)

Simplicity: Simple for n ≥ 1. The group
2B2(2)  is solvable.

Order:
q2
(q2 + 1)
(q − 1),
where
q = 22n+1.

Schur multiplier: Trivial for n ≠ 1, elementary abelian of order 4
for 2B2(8).

Outer automorphism group:
 1⋅f⋅1,
where f = 2n + 1.

Other names: Suz(22n+1), Sz(22n+1).

Isomorphisms: 2B2(2) is the Frobenius group of order 20.

Remarks: Suzuki group are Zassenhaus groups acting on sets of size (22n+1)2 + 1, and have 4-dimensional representations over the field with 22n+1 elements. They are the only non-cyclic simple groups whose order is not divisible by 3. They are not related to the sporadic Suzuki group.

Ree groups and Tits group, 2F4(22n+1)

Simplicity: Simple for n ≥ 1. The derived group 2F4(2)′ is simple of index 2
in 2F4(2), and is called the Tits group,
named for the Belgian mathematician Jacques Tits.

Order:
q12
(q6 + 1)
(q4 − 1)
(q3 + 1)
(q − 1),
where
q = 22n+1.

The Tits group has order 17971200 = 211 ⋅ 33 ⋅ 52 ⋅ 13.

Schur multiplier: Trivial for n ≥ 1 and for the Tits group.

Outer automorphism group:
 1⋅f⋅1,
where f = 2n + 1. Order 2 for the Tits group.

Remarks: Unlike the other simple groups of Lie type, the Tits group does not have a BN pair, though its automorphism group does so most authors count it as a sort of honorary group of Lie type.

Ree groups, 2G2(32n+1)

Simplicity: Simple for n ≥ 1. The group 2G2(3) is not simple, but its derived group 2G2(3)′ is a  simple subgroup of index 3.

Order:
q3
(q3 + 1)
(q − 1),
where
q = 32n+1

Schur multiplier: Trivial for n ≥ 1 and for 2G2(3)′.

Outer automorphism group:
 1⋅f⋅1,
where f = 2n + 1.

Other names: Ree(32n+1), R(32n+1), E2∗(32n+1) .

Isomorphisms: The derived group 2G2(3)′ is isomorphic to A1(8).

Remarks: 2G2(32n+1) has a doubly transitive permutation representation on 33(2n+1) + 1 points and acts on a 7-dimensional vector space over the field with 32n+1 elements.

Sporadic groups

Mathieu groups, M11, M12, M22, M23, M24

Janko groups, J1, J2, J3, J4

Conway groups, Co1, Co2, Co3

Fischer groups, Fi22, Fi23, Fi24′

Higman–Sims group, HS
Order: 29 ⋅ 32 ⋅ 53 ⋅ 7 ⋅ 11 = 44352000

Schur multiplier:  Order 2.

Outer automorphism group: Order 2.

Remarks: It acts as a rank 3 permutation group on the Higman Sims graph with 100 points, and is contained in Co2 and in Co3.

McLaughlin group, McL
Order: 27 ⋅ 36 ⋅ 53 ⋅ 7 ⋅ 11 = 898128000

Schur multiplier:  Order 3.

Outer automorphism group: Order 2.

Remarks: Acts as a rank 3 permutation group on the McLaughlin graph with 275 points, and is contained in Co2 and in Co3.

Held group, He
Order:
210 ⋅ 33 ⋅ 52 ⋅ 73 ⋅ 17 = 4030387200

Schur multiplier: Trivial.

Outer automorphism group: Order 2.

Other names: Held–Higman–McKay group, HHM, F7, HTH

Remarks: Centralizes an element of order 7 in the monster group.

Rudvalis group, Ru
Order:
214 ⋅ 33 ⋅ 53 ⋅ 7 ⋅ 13 ⋅ 29 = 145926144000

Schur multiplier: Order 2.

Outer automorphism group: Trivial.

Remarks: The double cover acts on a 28-dimensional lattice over the Gaussian integers.

Suzuki sporadic group, Suz
Order: 213 ⋅ 37 ⋅ 52 ⋅ 7 ⋅ 11 ⋅ 13 = 448345497600

Schur multiplier:  Order 6.

Outer automorphism group: Order 2.

Other names: Sz

Remarks: The 6 fold cover acts on a 12-dimensional lattice over the Eisenstein integers. It is not related to the Suzuki groups of Lie type.

O'Nan group, O'N
Order:
29 ⋅ 34 ⋅ 5 ⋅ 73 ⋅ 11 ⋅ 19 ⋅ 31 = 460815505920

Schur multiplier: Order 3.

Outer automorphism group: Order 2.

Other names: O'Nan–Sims group, O'NS, O–S

Remarks:
The triple cover has two 45-dimensional representations over the field with 7 elements, exchanged by an outer automorphism.

Harada–Norton group, HN
Order:
214 ⋅ 36 ⋅ 56 ⋅ 7 ⋅ 11 ⋅ 19 = 273030912000000

Schur multiplier: Trivial.

Outer automorphism group: Order 2.

Other names: F5, D

Remarks: Centralizes an element of order 5 in the monster group.

Lyons group, Ly
Order:
28 ⋅ 37 ⋅ 56 ⋅ 7 ⋅ 11 ⋅ 31 ⋅ 37 ⋅ 67 = 51765179004000000

Schur multiplier: Trivial.

Outer automorphism group: Trivial.

Other names: Lyons–Sims group, LyS

Remarks: Has a 111-dimensional representation over the field with 5 elements.

Thompson group, Th
Order: 215 ⋅ 310 ⋅ 53 ⋅ 72 ⋅ 13 ⋅ 19 ⋅ 31 = 90745943887872000

Schur multiplier: Trivial.

Outer automorphism group: Trivial.

Other names: F3, E

Remarks: Centralizes an element of order 3 in the monster, and is contained in E8(3), so has a 248-dimensional representation over the field with 3 elements.

Baby Monster group, B
Order:
   241 ⋅ 313 ⋅ 56 ⋅ 72 ⋅ 11 ⋅ 13 ⋅ 17 ⋅ 19 ⋅ 23 ⋅ 31 ⋅ 47
 = 4154781481226426191177580544000000

Schur multiplier: Order 2.

Outer automorphism group: Trivial.

Other names: F2

Remarks: The double cover is contained in the monster group. It has a representation of dimension 4371 over the complex numbers (with no nontrivial invariant product), and a representation of dimension 4370 over the field with 2 elements preserving a commutative but non-associative product.

Fischer–Griess Monster group, M
Order:
   246 ⋅ 320 ⋅ 59 ⋅ 76 ⋅ 112 ⋅ 133 ⋅ 17 ⋅ 19 ⋅ 23 ⋅ 29 ⋅ 31 ⋅ 41 ⋅ 47 ⋅ 59 ⋅ 71
 = 808017424794512875886459904961710757005754368000000000

Schur multiplier: Trivial.

Outer automorphism group: Trivial.

Other names: F1, M1, Monster group, Friendly giant, Fischer's monster.

Remarks: Contains all but 6 of the other sporadic groups as subquotients. Related to monstrous moonshine. The monster is the automorphism group of the 196,883-dimensional Griess algebra and the infinite-dimensional monster vertex operator algebra, and acts naturally on the monster Lie algebra.

Non-cyclic simple groups of small order

(Complete for orders less than 100,000)

 lists the 56 non-cyclic simple groups of order less than a million.

See also
List of small groups

Notes

References

Further reading

Simple Groups of Lie Type by Roger W. Carter, 
 Conway, J. H.; Curtis, R. T.; Norton, S. P.; Parker, R. A.; and Wilson, R. A.: "Atlas of Finite Groups: Maximal Subgroups and Ordinary Characters for Simple Groups."  Oxford, England 1985.
 Daniel Gorenstein, Richard Lyons, Ronald Solomon The Classification of the Finite Simple Groups (volume 1), AMS, 1994 (volume 3), AMS, 1998

 Atlas of Finite Group Representations: contains representations and other data for many finite simple groups, including the sporadic groups.
 Orders of non abelian simple groups up to 1010, and on to 1048 with restrictions on rank.

External links
 Orders of non abelian simple groups up to order 10,000,000,000.

Mathematics-related lists
Group theory
Sporadic groups